The 2018 Villanova Wildcats football team represented Villanova University in the 2018 NCAA Division I FCS football season. They were led by second-year head coach Mark Ferrante and played their home games at Villanova Stadium. They were a member of the Colonial Athletic Association. They finished the season 5–6, 2–6 in CAA play to finish in a tie for tenth place.

Previous season
The Wildcats finished the 2017 season 5–6, 3–5 in CAA play to finish in a three-way tie for seventh place.

Preseason

CAA Poll
In the CAA preseason poll released on July 24, 2018, the Wildcats were predicted to finish in sixth place.

Preseason All-CAA Team
The Wildcats had two players selected to the preseason all-CAA team including quarterback Trevor Knight being selected as offensive player of the year.

Offense

Ethan Greenidge – OL

Defense

Rob Rolle – S

Schedule

Game summaries

at Temple

at Lehigh

Towson

Bucknell

at Stony Brook

at Maine

James Madison

New Hampshire

at Richmond

William & Mary

at Delaware

Ranking movements

References

Villanova
Villanova Wildcats football seasons
Villanova Wildcats football